Saint-Julien-lès-Montbéliard (literally Saint-Julien near Montbéliard) is a commune in the Doubs department in the Bourgogne-Franche-Comté region in eastern France.

Geography

Population

See also
 Communes of the Doubs department

References

External links

 Saint-Julien-les-Montbéliard on the regional Web site 
 Official Web site

Communes of Doubs
County of Montbéliard